Megachile indica is a species of bee in the family Megachilidae. It was described by Gupta in 1988.

References

indica
Insects described in 1988